Nags Head Beach Cottages Historic District, also known as the Nags Head Beach Cottage Row Historic District, is a national historic district located at Nags Head, Dare County, North Carolina.  The district encompasses 41 contributing buildings dating from the late-19th and early-20th century.  The district is characterized by a string of frame wood-shingled cottages and includes notable examples of Late Gothic Revival and Queen Anne style architecture.

It was listed on the National Register of Historic Places in 1977.

References

Houses on the National Register of Historic Places in North Carolina
Historic districts on the National Register of Historic Places in North Carolina
Queen Anne architecture in North Carolina
Gothic Revival architecture in North Carolina
Houses in Dare County, North Carolina
National Register of Historic Places in Dare County, North Carolina